Anthony Sean Johnson (born June 22, 1967) is a former American football cornerback in the National Football League (NFL) for the Washington Redskins and the San Diego Chargers.  He played college football at Texas State University and was drafted in the sixth round of the 1989 NFL Draft. His nephew is former Tennessee Titans safety Kenny Vaccaro.

1967 births
Living people
People from Lompoc, California
Players of American football from California
American football cornerbacks
Texas State Bobcats football players
San Diego Chargers players
Sportspeople from Santa Barbara County, California
Washington Redskins players
Ed Block Courage Award recipients